Daigle or D'Aigle is a modification of the French surname Daigre. The first appearance of the last-name Daigle in the Americas was in Beaubassin, Nova Scotia in 1727. The last name Daigre originated in France and is likely the surname of peoples migrating from Aigre, France to New France in the Americas during the 16th and 17th centuries. Olivier Daigre (Daigle) is the first Daigre to appear on record in Nova Scotia when he arrived in 1663, and in 1666 when he married Marie Gaudet, daughter of Denis G. and Martine Gauthier. Olivier and Marie had 10 children, including two sons who all lived in the Port Royal and Grand Pre areas of Nova Scotia for three generations until the expulsion of Acadians from Canada by England.

A Daigle population exists in Louisiana today due to the forced deportation of Acadians by the British empire from 1755 to 1764. The British were able to deport 11,500 of the recorded 14,100 Acadians living in Canada at the time, many of whom were Daigles. It is presumed that 2,600 Acadians remained in their colonies by eluding capture. The Acadians were transported by ship to Virginia where they were not accepted by the local population. Many then moved south to Spanish-owned Louisiana. Acadians deported later were sent to Britain as prisoners of war for seven years. Spain offered a solution for reuniting Acadian families (not France) by providing seven ships that transported segregated Acadian families, including Daigles, from Europe to Louisiana.

Olivier Daigle is one of the first Acadian Daigles on record in the Americas, but many Daigles come from another ancestor, Jean Daigle, who migrated from France to Canada during the 1600s, similar to Olivier. Jean Daigle had a son Etienne who moved to Louisiana in 1711 and never returned, making New Orleans his homestead. There are many descendants of Jean Daigle living in the Church Point and Southwest areas of Louisiana to this day. The Acadian Daigles originated from Olivier Daigle and Marie Gaudet and the French-Canadian Daigles originated from Jean Daigle and Marie Anne Proteau/Croteau.

People

Alain Daigle (born 1954), Canadian-born US ice hockey player
Alexandre Daigle (born 1975), Canadian ice hockey player
Angela Daigle (born 1976), US track and field athlete
Armand Daigle (1892–1957), Canadian politician
Casey Daigle (born 1981), US baseball player
France Daigle (born 1953), Canadian author
Jennie Daigle (born 1980), US softball player, also known as Jennie Finch
Joseph Daigle (New Brunswick politician) (born 1934), Canadian lawyer, politician, Justice
Joseph Daigle (Quebec politician) (1831–1908), Canadian merchant, civil servant, politician
Jules O. Daigle (1900–1998), Roman Catholic priest, author of first dictionary devoted to Cajun French language
Lauren Daigle (born 1991) American singer
Matt Daigle (born 1972), US graphic artist noted for providing International breastfeeding symbol
Reuben D'Aigle (1874–1959), Canadian prospector in the Klondike, Ontario, Quebec and Labrador
Sylvie Daigle (born 1962), Canadian speed skater

Places
Aigle, district in Switzerland
Daigle, Maine, small town in Maine
L'Aigle a town in the Orne department in Normandy in northwestern France.
Le Bec d'Aigle, a massive rock which shelters Parc du Mugel in France ("Eagle's Beak")
Colline d'Aigle, the second highest prominence in Louisiana ("Eagle Hill")
Nid d'Aigle, a terminus of the Mont Blanc Tramway in France ("Eagle's Nest")

Other
Tremblay v. Daigle, a decision of the Supreme Court of Canada that a fetus has no legal status in Canada as a person